Thamizh Padam is a 2010 Indian Tamil-language parody film written and directed by C. S. Amudhan in his directorial debut. The film stars Shiva and Disha Pandey. Thamizh Padam was the first full-length spoof in Tamil cinema. It parodies contemporary commercial films and actors in Tamil cinema, mocking the stereotypical scenes.

The film was distributed by Dhayanidhi Alagiri under the banner Cloud Nine Movies, and it was released on 29 January 2010. It won critical acclaim and commercial success at the box office. The film was later remade in Telugu as Sudigadu starring Allari Naresh. A sequel called Thamizh Padam 2 was confirmed and released in July 2018; however, it was not as successful.

Plot
In the Indian village of Cinemapatti, male infanticide is predominant, and all male babies are required to be killed immediately after birth. One such baby is headed for such a fate, until he "speaks" to his caretaker-grandmother (Paravai Muniyamma) and asks to be sent to Chennai on a goods train, where he plans to grow into a hero. The old woman complies, and takes the baby, named Shiva, to Chennai and raises him herself, living in the city's poorer section.

On growing into manhood, Shiva (Shiva) gains a reputation by giving a massive entry by beating up extortionists by throwing them in the air and saving a rape victim; soon he is glorified as a "mass hero". He manages to defeat gangster Devaraj with a clever exchange of puns and a costumed associate. He spends his time hanging out, drinking and playing carrom with his gang of friends, composed of Nakul (M. S. Bhaskar), Bharath (Vennira Aadai Moorthy) and Siddharth (Manobala).

Shiva runs into a headstrong girl named Priya (Disha Pandey) whom he falls in love with. After learning of her hatred for men, he realises that she has dedicated her life to classical dance, learns Bharatanatyam over the course of a night, and performs an exaggerated dance sequence for her. She reciprocates his feelings, and the two start a relationship. Shiva is then challenged by Priya's rich and powerful father Kodeeswaran, who refuses to give his daughter to a poor man. Shiva swears to become a billionaire, and promptly does so, during the course of a 2:50-minute song.

Kodeeswaran accepts Shiva as a suitor, and fixes his engagement to Priya. During the ceremony, Shiva hears a passing comment that he does not know his own father. Offended, he travels to Cinemapatti, accompanied by Bharath, to learn his roots. After encountering a host of Tamil-cinema stereotypes of several decades ago, he succeeds in uniting with his family when a woman (revealed to be Shiva's father's concubine) leads him to his father, mother and sister. He finds them when they sing their "family song" (the Michael Learns to Rock number, "Someday").

However, unknown to anyone, Shiva has been targeting and killing several criminals in secret; he kills female gangster Swarna by making her slip over a banana peel; makes another big-time crook laugh to death; tortures a drug dealer to commit suicide by continuous failed attempts on his life; and kills his final victim with the odour of his sock. The police discover that he is the killer, and it is revealed that Shiva is actually an undercover officer and was killing the criminals under direct orders from not only the Commissioner, but also from the President of the United States.

The ganglord who commandeered the slain criminals, a mysterious person simply called "D", organises the kidnapping of Priya by telling Pandian (Sathish), and his henchmen to kidnap her and has Shiva beaten up. Shiva recovers, saves Priya by fighting off thugs using exaggerated stunts, and comes face to face with "D", revealed to be his grandmother. She explains that she did it to increase the fame of her grandson, and a heartbroken Shiva is forced to arrest her.

At the trial, Shiva accidentally kills an assassin who targets his grandmother, and is put on trial himself. He is saved, however, when a man who had helped him in Cinemapatti earlier testifies that Shiva was a victim of circumstance. Both Shiva and "D" are pardoned, and Shiva who has been promoted to DGP, unites happily with Priya, his family and friends.

Cast

 Shiva as Shiva
 Disha Pandey as Priya
 M. S. Bhaskar as Nakul
 Manobala as Siddharth
 Vennira Aadai Moorthy as Bharath
 V. S. Raghavan as Judge
 Delhi Ganesh as "Heroin" Kumar
 Periyar Dasan as Mokkai (Shiva's father)
 Ponnambalam as Nattamai
 Shanmuga Sundaram as CBI officer Shanmuga Sundaram
 Paravai Muniyamma as Grandmother (D)
 Mahanadi Shankar as 'Paan Parag' Ravi
 Halwa Vasu as Kodeeswaran's assistant
 Sathish as Pandiya
 Kasthuri in an item number
 Seenu as Devaraj
 Azhagu as Kodeeswaran (Priya's father)
 Meesai Rajendran as DGP Sundaram
 Ammu Ramachandran as Sheela
 Kovai Senthil as Kanakku (Nattamai's assistant)
 Nellai Siva as Minister
 Boys Rajan as Commissioner Natrajan
 Ayyappan as rape victim
 Benjamin as Railway Guard
 Theni Kunjarammal
 Gopichand
 Ram Kapoor

Production
S. Sashikanth, who was looking for scripts for his debut production for his production banner YNOT Studios got in touch with C. S. Amudhan who was willing to make his directorial debut submitted three pitches in different genres for his consideration, out of which Sashikanth chosen the script of spoofs and went ahead with it.

Release
In order to receive the film a wide release, Sashikanth opted to sell the film to Dayanidhi Alagiri who distributed and released the film under his company Cloud Nine Movies.

Reception
Upon release, the film received critical acclaim en route to becoming one of the box office successes of the year in Tamil Nadu. Rediff.com called the film a "must watch", while Sify.com labelled the film as a "rollicking comedy" and gave particular praise for Shiva's performance and the director's script and dialogues.

However The Times of India rated it 2.5/5, commenting, "It's a brilliant idea, to make a mocumentary of Tamil cinema, and the very concept raises your expectations" and concluded, "Having dared to test the waters, the director seems to have stepped back in apprehension."

Soundtrack

The film's soundtrack was composed by debutant Kannan. The soundtrack contains five songs.

List of notable spoofs

Films & soap operas

 Karuththamma – The opening scene shows Periyar Dasan as the father of a baby who is about to be killed. Dasan played the same role in Karuththamma as well. This version shows male infanticide instead of female infanticide.
 Boys –  Siva's friends are named after the actors in the film. Their introduction scene, as well as Siddarth's failed attempt to impress his girlfriend, are based on this film.
 Thalapathi – The scene where Devaraj visits his brother and asks for forgiveness.
 Priya – The scene where Devaraj's gang asks Siva to meet Devaraj, Siva's eyes are blindfolded, and he tried to locate the place while sensing sounds while he is in the car.
 Ghajini – Siva remembers that he has to kill Swarna when he looks at a Polaroid photo of her.
 Minsara Kanavu – A small part of the dance in the song 'Oh Maha Zeeya' is the same as what Prabhu Deva does in Minsara Kanavu in the song 'Vennilavae Vennilavae'.
 Enga Ooru Pattukaran – A similar character is shown as a resident of Cinemapatti. One of the film's promotional posters showed Shiva in Ramarajan's look as milkman from this film.
 Kizhakke Pogum Rail – At Cinemapatti railway station, a woman is shown sending messages at the back of the train compartment. The song "Koovura Sandham" from the film can be heard as background music for the scene.
 Pokkiri – The hero is revealed to be an undercover police officer.
 Baasha – Siva's meeting with Devaraj is heavily based on the encounter between Rajinikanth and Raghuvaran in Baasha. Siva's fight in market – circle of rowdies around him and walking is based on Rajini's walk in Baasha when he hits Anandaraj. Villain D shoots the henchman when the henchman says "India lost the cricket match". In Baasha, Raghuvaran shoots his henchman when he conveys a bad news.
 Run – Siva is chased by thugs, and when he is not visible to them, he sticks a small fake birthmark on his face. When the thugs find him, they are unable to recognize him, though he is in the same dress. Even his girlfriend finds it difficult to recognize him.
 Ramana – Devraj is shown to accidentally meet other guy also called Ramana before his brother (and asks forgiveness to Ramana). The protagonist of the film is famous for his dialogue "Tamilla enakku pidikkatha vaarthai...Mannippu" (meaning "Sorry is the only word I hate in Tamil").
 Annamalai – Siva challenges his lover's father and claims that he will become a millionaire (and subsequently does).
 Sivaji – Siva meets a minister to report about the lack of water and ends up selling his cycle to him similar to the act of Rajini selling his car from the film. His unique way of signing documents is also based on Sivaji. Also, Siva's stepmom has a laptop that is unlocked by her voice, similar to what Rajni has in the movie.
 Billa – A transvestite has a Billa tattoo that says "Swarna".
 Apoorva Sagodharargal – Siva appears as a dwarf and attempts to kill a criminal using a Rube Goldberg machine. Delhi Ganesh reprises his role as the villain.
 Anniyan – Siva tries to force buffalo to stampede and kill a criminal. In the same sequence, he tries to imitate Anniyan's voice with no success.
 Nayagan – The people look to Siva as their savior and ask for his help in repairing the water pipe.
 Citizen – In the climax court scene, the judge mentions the name of Athippatti Citizen, who is a character in this film.
 Captain Prabhakaran – In the climax court scene, the judge mention the name of Captain Prabhakaran, who is the titular character in this film, comparing Siva's act to his.
 Dhool – The character of Swarna is directly lifted from this film.
 Vaidehi Kathirunthal – The character of Vellaichamy is a spoof of Vijayakanth's character from this movie.
 Surya Vamsam – The people in Cinemapatti waiting for the character of Vellaichamy to start singing a song is a spoof of Sarath Kumar's character in this movie.
 Mouna Ragam – Siva proposes to Priya using the college intercom.
 Nattamai – The character of the same name appears in the film. Ponnambalam, who appeared as villain in that film, played as Naattamai.
 Chinna Thambi – A scene depicting three brothers protecting their sister by making her walk on their palms.
 Kaakha Kaakha – The hero and heroine travel in an open jeep to a retreat in Pondicherry, where the hero is beaten up and the heroine gets kidnapped. Pandiya, the villain character of that film, is also imitated. An instrumental version of the song Ennai Konjam is part of the background score. (Siva even mentions that a certain Mr. Anbuselvam is travelling ahead of them on the same route)
 Muthirai – Siva's cheri home turns out to be very posh within.
 Dasavathaaram – The appearance of the Tamil Nadu Chief Minister, Indian Prime Minister Manmohan Singh and the President of the United States.
 Thirupachi – The villains tie up the heroine in an abandoned warehouse, and the hero arrives in the nick of time to save her.
 Virumaandi – The title character appears in the film. Bharath remarks that Virumaandi means well, but is always misunderstood. The instrumental version of song "Kombula Poova" can be heard during the scene.
 Vettaiyaadu Vilaiyaadu – A cop who imitates Kamal Hassan asks for permission to go to America.
 Kanthaswamy – A man wearing Kanthaswamy's costume is an associate of Siva. The parodied version is named Kuppuswamy.
 Mozhi – Siva first encounters Priya as she is beating up another woman. Bharath's "signals" of love, and the heroine's friend named Sheela, are all based on Mozhi.
 Kadhalan – Siva goes to Priya's house and performs "classical dance" to win her love. (same scene was parodied in Sonna Puriyathu)
 Kadhalukku Mariyadhai – Siva and a girl simultaneously take the same book "Love and Love Only".
 Rasigan, Deva, Vishnu, Maanbumigu Maanavan, Once More – The "Pacha Manja" song features a caption which says that the hero sang the song.
 Palayathu Amman – When the hero enters Cinemapatti, they encounter film set of a moving Amman statue similar to all Rama Narayanan films, especially Palayathu Amman.
 En Rasavin Manasile – In Cinemapatti village, a person on the roadside is shown eating mutton.
 Sethupathi IPS – A policeman resembling Vijayakanth blames the murders on Pakistani terrorists.
 Chidambara Rahasiyam – The "mystery villain" D is portrayed similar to Delhi Ganesh's portrayal of the Black Cat in this film.
 Veerasamy – Priya, a fan of T. Rajendar, holds a DVD of this film and declares it an "epic". 
 Chandramukhi  – Siva's introduction scene shows him stretching his leg (the scene from Chandramukhi is parodied when it is revealed that Siva has a split seam in his pants).
 Mappillai – When Siva punches and kicks the giant, the giant shows no sign of pain.
 Chennai 600028- A goon working for Kodeeswaran tells that he has seen Shiva in Chennai 600028.
 7G Rainbow Colony – Bharath's father scolding him, like Vijayan does in Rainbow Colony.
 Naalai Namadhe – Siva's family having a family song like in this movie, though it is an English song.
Thirumalai - Similar to Vijay from the film, Siva is seen playing carrom with his friends.
Dhill - The doctor tells the commissioner that Siva will not be able to walk for 10 years, but he gets up and walks, which the doctor calls a 'medical miracle', similar to the scene in this movie.
Senthoora Poove - One of the film's promotional posters showed Shiva in Ramki's look holding Dafli from the film's title song.
Thillana Mohanambal - One of the film's promotional posters showed Shiva in Sivaji Ganesan's look as Nadhaswaram artist from the film.
Singaravelan - One of the film's promotional posters showed Shiva in Kamal Haasan's look from the song "Pudhu Cheri Kacheri" 
Chithi - The film also parodies the popular mega serial 'Chithi'. This is shown, when Shiva discovers his stepmother in his native village and calls her 'Chithi', which can be heard by the background sound during the scene.

People
 Kamal Haasan – When a conversation mentions that Virumaandi is a good man and all that he does gets misconstrued.
 Vijay – At the beginning of the film, there are references to his punch dialogues and also imitates the slogan saying that particular hero has sung the song. Later, Siva flexes his muscles like Vijay did in Vettaikaran.
 A. R. Rahman – The judge declares that the Government has to award a Golden Globe award to Paravai Muniyamma, to which she says "Ella Pugazhum Iraivanukke" (a popular dialogue uttered by Rahman at the 2009 Academy Awards).
 Nayanthara – During the song Kuthu Vilakku, a man dances in a bikini with a tattoo on his back, similar to Nayanthara's tattoo in Billa.
 Fathima Babu/Shobana Ravi – The TV reporter says her name is Fathima Ravi – a combination of the two famous newsreaders from Doordarshan TV.
 Silambarasan – The Nattamai character declares that anyone who disobeys his law will be forced to watch Silambarasan's films 100 times.
 Jyothika – The heroine introduction scene in which the girl who abuses her husband mentioning that she want to go to pub with her friend Trisha to have drinks.
 Rajinikanth – Siva becoming a rich man within one song is similar to the scenes in Rajinikanth movies of Annamalai and Padayappa.
 Barack Obama - After Siva tells several people that he is not interested in becoming a police officer again, he gets a call from Barack Obama.

Soundtrack
"Pacha Manja" - This song parodies introductory songs of film stars which has lyrics written to suit star's image.
"Kuthu Vilakku" - This song parodies item numbers which appeared in commercial films and these songs mostly happens at antagonists' place.
"Oru Sooravali" - This song parodies the song "Vetri Nichayam" and from the films like Suryavamsam (1997 film)  directed by Vikraman where male protagonist's transformation from poor guy to rich guy happens within one song.
"O Mahazeeya" - This song parodies romantic duets in Tamil cinema and lyrics of the song contains gibberish terms which coincidentally named after the chartbuster song names in Tamil cinema.

Others
Hutch – When Priya calls Siva's mobile phone, his ring tone is set to Hutch's signature tune and a dog follows him as depicted in the Hutch advertisement. He eventually gives brandy to the dog to stop it from following him.
ZooZoos from Vodafone – After Siva beats up the rowdies to save Priya, the ZooZoos attempt to defeat Siva in the name of BooBoos.
Santoor Soap – When Siva finds a girl being a young mother of a small girl, he utters "Mummy" similar to the advertisement.

Notes

References

External links
 
Tamil Padam Starcast interview

2010 films
Indian parody films
2010s parody films
Tamil films remade in other languages
2010s Tamil-language films
2010 directorial debut films